Dharmadom or Dharmadam is a census town in Thalassery taluk of Kannur district  in the state of Kerala, India. This town is located in between Anjarakandi River and Ummanchira river, and Palayad town and Arabian sea. It is known for the 100-year-old Government Brennen College and Dharmadam Island.

History        
The Dharmadam region was also called Poyanadu due to the belief that Dharmadam was the place from where the last Cheraman Perumal king of Kerala took his final departure on the journey to Mecca and sailed to Mecca.Legend of Cheraman Perumals, the first Indian mosque was built in 624 AD at Kodungallur with the mandate of the last the ruler (the Cheraman Perumal) of Chera dynasty, who converted to Islam during the lifetime of Prophet Muhammad (c. 570–632). According to Qissat Shakarwati Farmad, the Masjids at Kodungallur, Kollam, Madayi, Barkur, Mangalore, Kasaragod, Kannur, Dharmadam, Panthalayini, and Chaliyam, were built during the era of Malik Dinar, and they are among the oldest Masjids in Indian subcontinent. The 16th century Tuhfat Ul Mujahideen also states about the Masjid at Dharmapattanam (Dharmadam).

The island of Dharmapattanam was claimed by all of the Kolattu Rajas, Kottayam Rajas, and  Arakkal Bibi in the late medieval period. The island of Dharmadam was ceded to East India Company in 1734, along with Thalassery.

Demographics
As of 2011 Census, Dharmadam had a population of 30,804. Males constitute 45.4% of the population and females 54.6%. The average sex ratio was 1202 higher than state average of 1084. Dharmadom had an average literacy rate of 97.2%, higher than the state average of 94%: male literacy was 98.4% and, female literacy was 96.3%. In Dharmadam, 9.2% of the population is under 6 years of age.

Notable citizens
 Pinarayi Vijayan- Chief Minister of Kerala 2016 to present 
 M.N. Vijayan - Critic, writer and orator
 N Prabhakaran - Writer
 Valsalan Vathussery - Writer
 M.P. Kumarn - Historian, translator.
 DR.Ayyathan Gopalan - Renaissance leader and socialreformer of Kerala, Doctor, Writer.
DR.Ayyathan Janaki Ammal - First  female doctor&Surgeon of Kerala (Malabar), First Malayali Lady Doctor 
Moorkoth Ramunni - First malayalee fighter pilot

Gallery

See also
 Muzhappilangad
 Muzhappilangad beach
 Dharmadam Island
 Thalassery
 Thalassery cuisine
 Kannur
 Palayad
 Andalur
 Mangalore
 Sree Andalurkavu
 Educational Institutes in Thalassery

References

Cities and towns in Kannur district
Villages near Thalassery